Maden is an Austronesian language spoken on the west of Salawati Island, in the Raja Ampat Islands in Indonesian New Guinea.

Dialects
The dialects of Maden are as follows:
Butleh, also called Banlol (exonym) or Fiawat (village name)
Kawit
Tepin/Tipin

References

South Halmahera–West New Guinea languages
Languages of western New Guinea